Manzenreiter is a German surname. Notable people with the surname include:

Robert Manzenreiter (born 1966), Austrian luger
Sonja Manzenreiter (born 1975), Austrian luger

German-language surnames